Björn Eybl (born 21 February 1965) is an Austrian windsurfer. He competed in the Windglider event at the 1984 Summer Olympics.

References

External links
 
 
 

1965 births
Living people
Austrian windsurfers
Austrian male sailors (sport)
Olympic sailors of Austria
Sailors at the 1984 Summer Olympics – Windglider
Place of birth missing (living people)